The VROOOM Sessions is an album of instrumental outtakes recorded by King Crimson as studio improvisations during the rehearsals for the recording sessions of their 1994 comeback EP Vrooom.

These were the first studio recordings made by King Crimson after Robert Fripp reformed the band in 1994, in what has been called the "Double Trio" lineup. Along with Vrooom and the 1995 full-length THRAK and the Nashville Rehearsals, these are the only studio recordings of King Crimson's 1994-1997 formation. These outtakes were released through the band's Collectors' Club in December 1999, not long after Bill Bruford and Tony Levin had departed the band, bringing the Double Trio format to an end.

Track listing
"Bass Groove" (Adrian Belew, Bill Bruford Robert Fripp, Trey Gunn, Tony Levin, Pat Mastelotto) – 4:34
Recorded April 21, 1994
"Fashionable" (Belew, Bruford, Fripp, Gunn, Levin, Mastelotto) – 4:59
Recorded April 20, 1994
"Monster Jam" (Belew, Bruford, Fripp, Gunn, Levin, Mastelotto) – 8:38
Recorded May 4, 1994
"Slow Mellow" (Belew, Bruford, Fripp, Gunn, Levin, Mastelotto) – 2:57
Recorded April 26, 1994
"Krim 3" (Belew, Bruford, Fripp, Gunn, Levin, Mastelotto) – 3:20
Recorded April 26, 1994
"Funky Jam" (Belew, Bruford, Fripp, Gunn, Levin, Mastelotto) – 4:57
Recorded May 4, 1994
"Bill and Tony" (Bruford, Levin) – 1:36
Recorded April 28, 1994
"No Questions Asked" (Belew, Bruford, Fripp, Gunn, Levin, Mastelotto) – 3:24
Recorded April 23, 1994
"Adrian's Clouds" (Belew, Bruford, Fripp, Gunn, Levin, Mastelotto) – 1:39
Recorded April 22, 1994
"Calliope" (Belew, Bruford, Fripp, Gunn, Levin, Mastelotto) – 5:58
Recorded April 23, 1994
"One Time" (Belew, Bruford, Fripp, Gunn, Levin, Mastelotto) – 5:24
Recorded April 28, 1994
"Booga Looga" (Belew, Bruford, Fripp, Gunn, Levin, Mastelotto) – 3:45
Recorded April 23, 1994

Personnel
Robert Fripp – guitar, soundscapes (Frippertronics)
Adrian Belew – guitar
Tony Levin – bass guitar, Chapman stick
Trey Gunn – Chapman stick
Bill Bruford – drums, percussion
Pat Mastelotto – drums, percussion

1999 compilation albums
King Crimson Collector's Club albums